VRC may refer to:
Vaccine Research Center
Vancouver Rowing Club, formed in 1886
Veteran Reserve Corps
Victoria Racing Club
VRC Oaks
Videogame Rating Council, rating games for Sega of America
Virtual Radar Client, Windows radar simulator
Vex Robotics Competition
Great Britain Volunteer Rifle Corps of Volunteer Force
Vulnerability and Risk Committee of the American Society of Civil Engineers
VRChat